Hesperotingis fuscata is a species of lace bug in the family Tingidae. It is found in North America.

References

Further reading

 
 
 
 
 
 
 
 
 
 

Tingidae
Insects described in 1917